There are at least 115 named Islands in Montana.  These islands occur in rivers, lakes and reservoirs.

Islands east of the Continental Divide

Missouri River 
 Archers Island, Chouteau County, Montana, el. 
 Baker Bar, Chouteau County, Montana, el. 
 Boggs Island , Chouteau County, Montana, el. 
 Brule Bar, Chouteau County, Montana, el. 
 Buckshot Island, Cascade County, Montana, el. 
 Chelsea Island, Roosevelt County, Montana, el. 
 Council Island, Chouteau County, Montana, el. 
 Cow Island, Blaine County, Montana, el. 
 Crow Coulee Bar, Chouteau County, Montana, el. 
 Duck Island, Valley County, Montana, el. 
 Evans Bend, Chouteau County, Montana, el. 
 Fisher Island, Cascade County, Montana, el. 
 Grand Island, Phillips County, Montana, el. 
 Holmes Council Islands, Fergus County, Montana, el. 
 Iron City Islands, Fergus County, Montana, el. 
 Jones Island, Phillips County, Montana, el. 
 King Island, Fergus County, Montana, el. 
 Lower Two Calf Island, Phillips County, Montana, el. 
 Nelson Island, Cascade County, Montana, el. 
 PN Island, Fergus County, Montana, el. 
 Park Island, Cascade County, Montana, el. 
 Pine Island, Cascade County, Montana, el. 
 Pablo Island, Chouteau County, Montana, el. 
 Roosevelt Island, Chouteau County, Montana, el. 
 Sacajawea Island, Cascade County, Montana, el. 
 Scout Island, Valley County, Montana, el. 
 Shonkin Bar, Chouteau County, Montana, el. 
 Skinners Island, Roosevelt County, Montana, el. 
 Steamboat Island, Cascade County, Montana, el. 
 Sturgeon Island, Blaine County, Montana, el. 
 Taylor Island, Cascade County, Montana, el. 
 Three Islands, Chouteau County, Montana, el. 
 Upper Two Calf Island, Phillips County, Montana, el. 
 White Shield Island, Roosevelt County, Montana, el. 
 Wolf Island, Chouteau County, Montana, el. 
 Yorks Islands, Broadwater County, Montana, el.

Yellowstone River 
 Beaver Island, Richland County, Montana, el. 
 Big Marys Island, Yellowstone County, Montana, el. 
 Breakneck Island, Richland County, Montana, el. 
 Buella Island, Richland County, Montana, el. 
 Cherry Island, Yellowstone County, Montana, el. 
 Chrome Island, Wibaux County, Montana, el. 
 Crittenden Island, Richland County, Montana, el. 
 Devils Island, Richland County, Montana, el. 
 Diamond Island, Richland County, Montana, el. 
 Dovers Island, Yellowstone County, Montana, el. 
 Duck Island, Richland County, Montana, el. 
 Elk Island, Richland County, Montana, el. 
 Elms Island, Richland County, Montana, el. 
 Government Island, Yellowstone County, Montana, el. 
 Gros Ventre Island, Richland County, Montana, el. 
 Idiom Island, Richland County, Montana, el. 
 Howery Island, Treasure County, Montana, el. 
 Joes Island, Dawson County, Montana, el. 
 Livingston Island, Park County, Montana, el. 
 Marys Island, Richland County, Montana, el. 
 Monroe Island, Dawson County, Montana, el. 
 Pirogue Island, Custer County, Montana, el. 
 Randalls Island, Yellowstone County, Montana, el. 
 Schaffer Island, Dawson County, Montana, el. 
 Seven Sisters Island, Richland County, Montana, el. 
 Siebeck Island, Park County, Montana, el. 
 Snake Island, Richland County, Montana, el. 
 Spraklin Island, Yellowstone County, Montana, el. 
 Westover Island, Carbon County, Montana, el.

Other waters east of the divide 
 Big Island, Sheridan County, Montana, el.  in Medicine Lake
 Bruces Island, Sheridan County, Montana, el.  in Medicine Lake
 Far West Island, Big Horn County, Montana, el.  in the Big Horn River
 Fire Island, Sweet Grass County, Montana, el.  in the Boulder River
 Gull Island, Sheridan County, Montana, el.  in Medicine Lake
 Long Island, Phillips County, Montana, el.  in Lake Bowdoin
 Lovell Island, Beaverhead County, Montana, el.  in the Beaverhead River
 Pelican Islands, Phillips County, Montana, el.  in Lake Bowdoin
 Smith Island, Beaverhead County, Montana, el.  in the Beaverhead River
 The Island, Carter County, Montana, el.  in the Little Missouri River
 Thunderbird Island, Glacier County, Montana, el.  in Saint Mary Lake
 Youngs Island, Sheridan County, Montana, el.  in Medicine Lake
 Wild Goose Island, Glacier County, Montana, el.  in Saint Mary Lake
 Woody Island, Phillips County, Montana, el.  in Lake Bowdoin
 York Island, Garfield County, Montana, el.  in Fort Peck Lake

Islands west of the Continental Divide

Flathead Lake 
 Bird Island, Lake County, Montana, el. 
 Bull Island, Lake County, Montana, el. 
 Cedar Island, Lake County, Montana, el. 
 Cromwell Island, Lake County, Montana, el. 
 Douglas Islands, Lake County, Montana, el. 
 Dream Island, Lake County, Montana, el. 
 Goose Island, Lake County, Montana, el. 
 Invitation Island, Flathead County, Montana, el. 
 Melita Island, Lake County, Montana, el. 
 Little Bull Island, Lake County, Montana, el. 
 Mary B Island, Lake County, Montana, el. 
 Rock Island, Lake County, Montana, el. 
 Shelter Island, Lake County, Montana, el. 
 Wild Horse Island, Lake County, Montana, el.

Hungry Horse Reservoir
 Clayton Island, Flathead County, Montana, el. 
 Elk Island, Flathead County, Montana, el. 
 Fire Island, Flathead County, Montana, el. 
 Kelly Island, Flathead County, Montana, el. 
 Lost Island, Flathead County, Montana, el.

Lake Koocanusa
 Cedar Island, Lincoln County, Montana, el. 
 Kins Island, Lincoln County, Montana, el. 
 Murray Island, Lincoln County, Montana, el. 
 Whites Island, Lincoln County, Montana, el. 
 Yarnell Island, Lincoln County, Montana, el.

Other waters west of the divide 
 Deer Island, Flathead County, Montana, el.  in Echo Lake
 Callows Island, Lincoln County, Montana, el.  in Bull Lake
 Firemens Island, Flathead County, Montana, el.  in Echo Lake
 Kelly Island, Missoula County, Montana, el.  in the Clark Fork River
 Pleasant Island, Flathead County, Montana, el.  in Foy Lake
 Rock Island, Sanders County, Montana, el.  in Noxon Reservoir
 Scott Island, Lincoln County, Montana, el.  in the Kootenai River
 Sourdough Island, Missoula County, Montana, el.  in Salmon Lake (Montana)
 Steamboat Island, Sanders County, Montana, el.  in the Clark Fork River
 The Island, Flathead County, Montana, el.  in Whitefish Lake

Notes

Islands of Montana
Islands
Montana